Germany was represented by Mary Roos, with the song "Nur die Liebe läßt uns leben", at the 1972 Eurovision Song Contest, which took place on 25 March in Edinburgh. "Nur die Liebe läßt uns leben" was the winner of the German national final, Ein Lied für Edinburgh, held on 19 February. Roos would later represent Germany again in 1984.

Before Eurovision

Ein Lied für Edinburgh 
The final was held at the TV studios in West Berlin, hosted by Karin Tietze-Ludwig and Renate Bauer. Twelve songs took part with voting done in two parts by a 10-member jury. Firstly, each jury member awarded between 1 and 5 points to each song. The votes were tallied and the four highest-scoring songs went through to the next round. Each juror then named their favourite of the remaining four.

The voting was close (4-3-3-0) and the choice of "Nur die Liebe läßt uns leben" was not particularly warmly received, as "Geh' die Straße" by Cindy & Bert had won the first voting round and had received the best audience reception of the twelve songs. Roos herself expressed surprise at the victory, saying that she had assumed she had lost after the initial voting, and was returning to her dressing room to remove her make-up when she was declared the winner.

At Eurovision 
On the night of the final Roos was drawn to perform first in the running order, preceding France. At the close of voting "Nur die Liebe läßt uns leben" had received 107 points, placing Germany third of the 18 entries, the third consecutive contest in which Germany finished in third place.

Voting

References 

1972
Countries in the Eurovision Song Contest 1972
Eurovision